The Detroit Lions Television Network is a network of seven television stations (and one cable/satellite channel) in Michigan and Ohio that broadcast the NFL's Detroit Lions preseason games and related coverage. On May 21, 2015, the Detroit Lions announced a multi-year broadcast partnership with WJBK (Fox 2) and Fox Sports Detroit (now Bally Sports Detroit), where the regional sports network produces the preseason game broadcasts with Fox 2 producing the pre-game and post-game segments. The games air live on Fox 2 and the rest of the Detroit Lions Television Network, with re-airings on Bally Sports Detroit. Most of the stations are affiliates the Fox network, which airs a majority of Lions regular season games.

The wraparound shows' hosts are Fox 2 sports director and Lions radio announcer Dan Miller, former Lions wide receiver Herman Moore, and Fox 2 sports anchors/reporters Jennifer Hammond and Woody Woodriffe.   The game announcers are Brandon Gaudin with play-by-play, Herman Moore with color commentary, and Dannie Rodgers with sideline reports. The network also airs the weekly newsmagazine show Inside the Pride which is broadcast at various times on each affiliate.

Affiliates

<small>Source:
Bally Sports Detroit airs repeats only.

Former broadcasters

See also
Detroit Lions Radio Network

References

National Football League on television
Sports television networks in the United States